Lánov is a municipality and village in Trutnov District in the Hradec Králové Region of the Czech Republic. It has about 1,800 inhabitants.

Administrative parts
Lánov is made up of village parts of Horní Lánov and Prostřední Lánov.

References

Villages in Trutnov District